The People's Liberation Front of India (PLFI) is a militant  Maoist outfits formed in 2007 in Jharkhand. Earlier It was known as Jharkhand Liberation Tigers (JLT)   founded by Dinesh Gope a resident of Khunti district, Jharkhand in 2003. Later it renamed as PLFI. 

According to report, PLFI is responsible for around half of Maoist incident in Jharkhand and it's cadres are around 150-300. It's revenge is around Rs.1.5 billion by extortion per year. PLFI have been in clash with Communist Party of India (Maoist) with cadres of both groups have been involved in killing each other. Security forces have used it to counter CPI(Maoist). But due to this PLFI emerged as a major terror outfit in state.

History
In 2003, Dinesh Gope a resident of Lapa Morha Toli of Khunti district along with other raised Jharkhand Liberation Tigers (JLT) a Maoist outfit to fight against the corruption and misgovernance in Independent India. He was inspired by Subash Chandra Bose and Bhagat Singh. It later renamed as PLFI in 2007. Several cadres of  Communist Party of India (Maoist) joined PLFI. It detest to be clubbed with the Communist Party of India (Maoist), the main left-wing extremist group in India as it falsely promised a red revolution in Naxalbari uprising. It aim to struggle within confine of constitution of India and get rid of corruption and misgovernance. PLFI have been clashed with CPI (Maoist) in Jharkhand. In September 2009, four cadres including Jairam Gope of PLFI were killed in clash with CPI (Maoist) in Gumla district. Security forces have used it to counter CPI(Maoist). But due to this the PLFI emerged as major terror outfit in Jharkhand.

Timelines
In September 2009, four cadres of PLFI including Jairam Gope were killed in clash with CPI (Maoist) in Gumla district.
PLFI cadres killed Hardeep Singh in Sundergarh district, Odisha over dispute of extortion of money in 2012. 
PLFI cadres killed AJSU leader Tileswar Sahu in Hazaribagh in March 2014. 
Mukesh Yadav, cadres of PLFI carrying reward of 2 lakh arrested in December 2016. 
Jharkhand Police booked Dinesh Gope and seized his two plots and a flat in Ranchi in January 2017. 
In June 2018, Ravindra Yadav a PLFI cadres arrested in Lohardaga. 
In 2018, PLFI sub-zonal commander arrested for extortion of money from railway contractor in Latehar. 
In January 2017, Jharkhand Police booked PLFI zonal commander Jidan Gudia and seized cars, two tractor and motorcycle.  
In December 2017, Jharkhand Police booked PLFI sub-zonal commander Tilkeswar Gope and seized five SUVs and two buses.
In September 2020, Three member of PLFI arrested for demanding levy from coal exploration officials from Patratu.
 In May 2022, PLFI commander Laka Pahan killed in encounter with security forces in area under Murhu police station.

See also
Tritiya Prastuti Committee

References

External links
The Peoples' Liberation Front of India (PLFI) in Jharkhand

2003 establishments in India
Communist militant groups
Guerrilla organizations
Left-wing militant groups in India
Naxalite–Maoist insurgency
Organisations designated as terrorist by India